George B. Burrows (October 20, 1832 – February 25, 1909) was an American businessman and politician.

Born in Springfield, Vermont, Burrows married Alma Thompson, the daughter of Daniel Pierce Thompson, then moved to Sauk City, Wisconsin in 1858 to begin a banking career. In 1865, he moved to Madison, Wisconsin and was in the real estate business. Burrows served in the Wisconsin State Senate from the 25th district from 1877 to 1882 and was president pro tem in 1882. In 1895, Burrows served in the Wisconsin State Assembly and served as Assembly speaker. He was a Republican. Burrows died in Madison, Wisconsin and is buried there at Forest Hill Cemetery.

References

External links

Republican Party members of the Wisconsin State Assembly
Republican Party Wisconsin state senators
Businesspeople from Madison, Wisconsin
People from Springfield, Vermont
Politicians from Madison, Wisconsin
People from Sauk County, Wisconsin
1832 births
1909 deaths
19th-century American politicians
19th-century American businesspeople